Ignacio Guerra Martorell is a retired Chilean track and field athlete who competed in the javelin throw. He set both a national record and a personal best throw of 78.69 metres, by finishing first at Florida Relays and APSU Governors Invitational in Gainesville, Florida.

Guerra represented Chile at the 2008 Summer Olympics in Beijing, where he competed for the men's javelin throw. He performed a best throw of 73.03 metres from his third and final attempt, but fell short in his bid for the twelve-man final, as he placed twenty-fourth overall in the qualifying rounds.

Guerra is also a member of the track and field team for the WKU Hilltoppers, and also, a graduate of Marketing and Sales at the Western Kentucky University in Bowling Green, Kentucky.

Guerra retired from the javelin throw in 2015, after more than 20 years in the sport. He is currently Export Manager of Via Wines and Director of FreshWater.

References

External links

Profile – Western Kentucky University Athletics
NBC 2008 Olympics profile

1987 births
Living people
Chilean male javelin throwers
Olympic athletes of Chile
Athletes (track and field) at the 2008 Summer Olympics
Western Kentucky Hilltoppers and Lady Toppers athletes
Western Kentucky University alumni
Sportspeople from Santiago
South American Games bronze medalists for Chile
South American Games medalists in athletics
Competitors at the 2006 South American Games
Competitors at the 2014 South American Games
21st-century Chilean people